Malham M. Wakin is a retired United States Air Force brigadier general, and former head of the philosophy department at the U.S. Air Force Academy.

Early life and education
Wakin was raised in Oneonta, New York. He graduated from the University of Notre Dame in 1952, earned an M.A. from the State University of New York, and earned a Ph.D. at the University of Southern California in 1959.

Military and teaching career
Wakin joined the U.S. Air Force in 1953, and spent 42 years on active duty. The great majority of those years were spent teaching at the Air Force Academy, beginning in 1959. He retired from active duty in 1995, but continued to teach at the Academy until retiring from teaching in 2016.

One theme of Wakin's teaching career was challenging the assertion made by H.G. Wells in The Outline of History: "The professional military mind is by necessity an inferior and unimaginative mind; no man of high intellectual quality would willingly imprison his gifts in such a calling.".

Works

References

External links

Presentation by Wakin at the 2016 National Character and Leadership Symposium at the United States Air Force Academy

Living people
People from Oneonta, New York
University of Notre Dame alumni
University of Southern California alumni
United States Air Force generals
American philosophy academics
United States Air Force Academy faculty
Year of birth missing (living people)
Philosophers of war